Rear-Admiral Sir Edmund George Irving,  (5 April 1910 – 1 October 1990) was a naval hydrographer.

Early life
Irving was born in Sandakan, British North Borneo to the resident magistrate George Clerk Irving and his wife Ethel Mary Frances Poole.

Education
Irving attended St Anthony's preparatory school, Eastbourne, and the Royal Naval College, Dartmouth.

Career
In 1931 Irving joined the Royal Naval Surveying Service. After his ship berthed in Terneuzen his surveys of the Schelde enabled allied shipping to carry military supplies to Antwerp.

In the late 1950s, as a rear admiral, he was appointed Hydrographer of the Navy. He retired in 1966, subsequently working for the Decca company.

Honours
Irving was president of the Institute of Navigation from 1964 to 1967. He was president of the Royal Geographical Society (1969–71) and received their Patron's Medal in 1976.

Mount Irving in the South Shetland Islands was named in his honour.

References 

1910 births
1990 deaths
Companions of the Order of the Bath
English hydrographers
Fellows of the Royal Geographical Society
Hydrographers of the Royal Navy
Knights Commander of the Order of the British Empire
People from Meopham
Presidents of the Royal Geographical Society
Royal Navy rear admirals
Royal Navy officers of World War II